Dubasovo is a rural locality (a selo) in Posyolok Krasnoye Ekho, Gus-Khrustalny District, Vladimir Oblast, Russia. The population was 272 as of 2010.

Geography 
Dubasovo is located 36 km northeast of Gus-Khrustalny (the district's administrative centre) by road. Bolshaya Artemovka is the nearest rural locality.

References 

Rural localities in Gus-Khrustalny District
Sudogodsky Uyezd